Criminal Minds is a spin-off video game based on the CBS police procedural television series of the same name created by Jeff Davis. The game contains two completely new cases for people to solve.

In 2018, a new Criminal Minds game was announced by CBS and Tilting Point. This game, titled Criminal Minds: The Mobile Game, is a time management game that features the entire season 14 BAU Team as playable characters, and was released on November 20, 2018, on Android & iOS devices.

Release
The game was released on April 19, 2012.

See also
 Criminal Minds: Suspect Behavior

References

External links
 
 

2012 video games
Adventure games
Criminal Minds
Video games about police officers
Video games based on television series
Windows games
MacOS games
Detective video games
Video games developed in the United States
Single-player video games
Legacy Games games